Betty E. Unger (born August 21, 1943) is a Canadian politician and a former member of the Senate of Canada, from Alberta, Canada from January 2012 until her retirement in August 2018 upon reaching the mandatory retirement age of 75. Outside politics Unger owned and operated a successful nursing services company in Alberta for many years.

Political career
In 2000 Unger ran for the House of Commons of Canada as a candidate for the Canadian Alliance in Edmonton West, losing a close contest to Liberal Cabinet Minister Anne McLellan. The race was so close that the media prematurely declared a Canadian Alliance victory on election night.

In 2004 she ran as a candidate in the 2004 Alberta senate nominee election. She finished a close second place behind Bert Brown. She is the first Albertan woman to be elected a senator-in-waiting. On January 6, 2012, she was appointed to the Senate on the advice of Prime Minister Stephen Harper by Governor General David Johnston.

References

External links

Betty Unger homepage

1943 births
Canadian Alliance candidates for the Canadian House of Commons
Candidates in the 2000 Canadian federal election
Living people
Conservative Party of Canada senators
Canadian senators from Alberta
Women members of the Senate of Canada
Canadian senators-in-waiting from Alberta
20th-century Canadian women politicians
21st-century Canadian politicians
21st-century Canadian women politicians